Frederick Schiller Cozzens (1846–1928) was an American marine artist.

Early life 
Born Fred Schiller Cozzens on 11 October 1846 in New York City, he was the son of Frederick Swartwout Cozzens (1818–1869), the humorist, who sometimes wrote under the name Richard Haywarde, and Susan (Meyers) Cozzens.

Cozzens attended the Rensselaer Polytechnic Institute from 1864 to 1867, but did not complete the degree course; he was largely self taught as an artist.

Career 
Apart from his marine painting, he was an illustrator for The Daily Graphic, Harpers Weekly, Our Navy magazine, and others.

He also illustrated books on yachting, in 1884 a series of his chromolithographs, taken from earlier watercolors were reproduced in the book American Yachts: Their Clubs and Races, by U.S. Navy Lieutenant James Douglas Jerrold Kelley (J. D. Jerrold Kelley), published by Charles Scribner's Sons in 1884. This collection comprises his best known work. This book was the first of a series of four, the most notable follow-up being, Typical American Yachts (1886).

After 1899, he worked mainly on private watercolor commissions, mostly marine subjects. He continued painting up to about 1918.

He exhibited at the Boston Art Club, the Brooklyn Art Association, and the Mystic Seaport Association.

His work has been widely published.

Examples of his work have been bought by the Museum of the City of New York, New-York Historical Society, the New York Yacht Club, the Los Angeles County Museum of Art, and the National Maritime Museum, in London.

He often signed as Fred. S. Cozzens, and Frederic S. Cozzens.

Cozzens was a long time resident of Livingston, Staten Island, where he died on 29 August 1928.

References

Further reading 
 Americana, folk and decorative art, by Mary Jean Smith Madigan – 1982 – 159 pages – There was also the company of his friends, Fred Cozzens, his sketching companion; James Bard and James ... The Seamen's Bank for Savings in New York, long a collector of fine marine art, obtained many of its Jacobsens directly from the ...
 Sea history: Issues 77-82, National Maritime Historical Society – 1996 – Marine Art Ne Big Horn Becomes Regional Rendezvous If you had walked into the spacious Big Horn Gallery in Fairfield, Connecticut, ... which includes work by James E. Buttersworth, Robert Salmon, Antonio Jacobsen and Frederick Cozzens. ...
 Outing: sport, adventure, travel, fiction: Volume 12 – Page xvi, 1888 - , Part II Capt. R. F. Coffin 512-517 With five illustrations by Fred. S. Cozzens, and others. link
 The Dictionary of Nautical Literacy – Page 278, Robert McKenna – 2003 – 432 pages – Pansing, Frederick (1844–1910), German-born marine artist who went to sea at age sixteen and later emigrated to America. A contemporary of artists Antonio Jacobsen, James Buttersworth, and Frederick Cozzens, he is best known for his ...
 Mariner's Book of Days 2007, Peter H. Spectre – 2006 – 112 pages – Preview, OCCUPATIONS OF A FEW EARLY MARINE ARTISTS BEFORE THEY BECAME KNOWN FOR THEIR ART Antonio Jacobsen—safe painter ... engraver WT Richards—light-fixture designer James Hamilton—book illustrator Frederick S. Cozzens—newspaper and book ...
 American landscape and genre paintings in the New-York Historical ...: Volume 1, New-York Historical Society, Richard J. Koke – 1982 – 3 pages – 384 Sailing Vessel, 1924 Watercolor on illustration board, 15 x 21% inches Inscribed: Signed and dated, lower left: Fred S. Cozzens I 24. Bottom, center: Presented to my Old Sailor Friend Ex. Gov. William Sulzer I May 10, 1924. ...
 Exhibition ...: Volumes 16-17 – Page 115, Massachusetts Charitable Mechanic Association, Boston – 1888 – Fred S. Cozzens. 1M. Loxn luLAXii BeaiB. Fred S. Cozzens. Exhibit of Models by Ueoiige Law ley A Boss. xo. models. 100. St HOONF. ... 114. Sloop, Puritan. artist. HA Halleti. WP Stobbs. Exhibit by NL Stebbins, Marine Pbotograpbkb. ...
 Maritime America: art and artifacts from America's great nautical ..., Peter Neill – 1988 – 255 pages – Among these, however, perhaps the ultimate 119 in this original rendering for the frontispiece to Our Navy, Its Growth and Achievement, written by Jerrold Kelly, marine artist Frederick S Cozzens depicts the Columbian Naval Review of ...
 The Book buyer: a monthly review of American and foreign literature – Page 202, 1887 – Of the illustrations, of which there are over one hundred, it is sufficient to say they are drawn Chiefly by Mr. Fred S. Cozzens, so well known by his marine sketches. The volume is a collection of the articles that have been printed in ...

External links 

1846 births
1928 deaths
19th-century American painters
20th-century American painters
American marine artists
Painters from New York City
People from Livingston, Staten Island